The Site of California's First Grange Hall, also known as Pilot Hill Grange Hall No. 1, is a historic site that has been designated a California Historical Landmark. The organization was founded in 1870;  the building was completed in 1889.

The Pilot Hill Grange #1 recently left the Grange family and is now The Cool Community Center in Cool Ca.

It is California Historical Landmark number 551 (Located at 1701 State Hwy 193, in the town of Cool, 95614, it was relocated in the 1930s when a family donated land in Cool. Before that time, it was next to the Bayley House located in Pilot Hill, four miles south of Cool.).

See also
List of California Historical Landmarks

References

Grange organizations and buildings in California
History of El Dorado County, California
California Historical Landmarks